Lopatin may refer to:
 Lopatin (surname)
 Mount Lopatin, a mountain in Antarctica
 Ford & Lopatin, an American electronic music duo